This page details the process of qualifying for the 1970 African Cup of Nations.

Qualifying Tournament

First round

|}

Zambia won 5–4 on aggregate.

Cameroon won 3–2 on aggregate.

Tanzania won 2–1 on aggregate.

Algeria won 2–1 on aggregate.

Guinea won 5–1 on aggregate.

United Arab Republic progress, Somalia withdrew.

Mali progress, Upper Volta withdrew.

Niger progress, Nigeria withdrew.

Senegal progress, Sierra Leone withdrew.

Second round

|}

Ethiopia won 9–1 on aggregate.

Cameroon won 4–3 on aggregate.

Ghana won 15–1 on aggregate.

United Arab Republic won 2–1 on aggregate.

Guinea won 5–4 on aggregate.

Côte d'Ivoire won 4–0 on aggregate.

Qualified teams
The 8 qualified teams are:

External links
CAN 1970 details – rsssf.com

Africa Cup of Nations qualification
Qualification
Qual